Rebel Heart Tour is the fifth live album by American singer and songwriter Madonna, chronicling her tenth worldwide concert tour of the same name, recorded at Sydney's Allphones Arena. It was released on September 15, 2017 by Eagle Vision on DVD and Blu-ray formats and by Eagle Records for audio versions. Rebel Heart Tour also contains bonus content like excerpts from the Tears of a Clown show (2016) at Melbourne's Forum Theatre, as well as a 22-song double CD. Danny Tull and Nathan Rissman, who had worked on Madonna's previous concert films, directed Rebel Heart Tour.

The album received generally positive feedback from critics, who picked Madonna's live singing, dancing and the production as highlights. Rebel Heart Tour reached the top of the DVD and video charts in most of the countries it charted in, and top ten of the album charts in Belgium (Flanders and Wallonia), Germany, Hungary, Italy, Portugal and Spain. At the 32nd Japan Gold Disc Award, Rebel Heart Tour won in the category of Best Music Video for Western Artists.

Background

Madonna had embarked on the Rebel Heart Tour (2015–2016) to promote her thirteenth studio album, Rebel Heart. Performed in 82 shows across 55 cities, the tour was a commercial success earning US$169.8 million; it was attended by an audience of over 1.045 million. The performances at the Allphones Arena in Sydney, Australia were recorded for the video release.

In September 2016, Madonna announced on her Instagram that she had finished watching a "rough assembly" of the tour's film, and it would be out in the next two months. Entertainment Weekly subsequently announced that the concert film would premiere on December 9, 2016 on American cable channel Showtime. Titled Madonna: Rebel Heart Tour, it featured behind-the-scenes footage from the Australian performances of the tour, which had been exclusively previewed by Billboard on December 2, 2016. Danny Tull and Nathan Rissman, who had worked on Madonna's previous concert films, directed Rebel Heart Tour. Madonna explained in an interview with BBC News:
I was there every step of the way, every day for months and months. It's really hard to capture the true feeling of the excitement and the passion and the heat and the blood, sweat and tears. I'm pleased with the way it came out... [W]hen I look back at the DVD it almost brings a tear to my eye because everyone seems so in love.

The film was released on September 15, 2017 on DVD, Blu-ray, and digital formats, containing bonus content like the Tears of a Clown show at Melbourne's Forum Theatre in 2016, as well as a 22-song double CD. The cover image was shot by fashion photographer Joshua Brandão. British Board of Film Classification (BBFC) listed the total running time of the album at over 138 minutes, with almost two hours for the main tour film and the rest for Tears of a Clown and a bonus performance of "Like a Prayer" (1989) during one of the shows. The release of Rebel Heart Tour was distributed by Eagle Rock Entertainment. It was made available for pre-order on August 16, 2017, Madonna's birthday, in all physical and digital-file-based stores. Along with the pre-order, a live version of "Material Girl" was purchasable from the digital outlets. The Japanese edition of the DVD/ Blu-ray included a performance of "Take a Bow" (1994) as a bonus track. Five years after its original release, the album was reissued on vinyl format by Mercury Records on September 9, 2022, featuring the same 14 tracks as the single-CD format.

Critical response

Markos Papadatos from the Digital Journal gave the album a rating of A describing the release as a "must for any die-hard fan of Madonna". Jeffrey Kaufman from Blu-ray.com gave a rating of four stars out of five for the release, saying that Madonna knows "how to provide amazing visuals for a Blu-ray concert release to accompany an interesting if kind of random assortment of tunes from her by now pretty long career." He further complimented the production, the video and the audio quality of the album, recommending it for being "constantly over the top and often quite breathtaking". Writing for Decider, Benjamin H. Smith opined that "the 2017 concert film, Madonna: Rebel Heart Tour, shows the Material Girl hasn't lost any steps now that she's more a grande dame [...] what she debatably lacks as a vocalist, she has always made up for with her ability to craft her persona, like David Bowie, altering it to keep up with the latest trends, but always maintaining her singular identity", but pointed out that  "it was her ‘80s songbook that got the biggest response".

Daryl Deino from Inquisitr gave a positive review for the live album of the release, but criticized its DVD and Blu-ray versions for poor editing. He named Rebel Heart Tour Madonna's best live album to date and found it superior to the DVD and Blu-ray. He also complimented Madonna's live, unprocessed vocals on the album, praising in particular her cover of "La Vie en rose", calling it "the best vocal performance of her career so far [...] this is a song nobody could imagine [Madonna] covering at the beginning of her career. Now, it sounds natural". Although the singer's voice sounded "strained" to Deino during the dance sequences, it was not noticeable in the video versions since "Madonna's dancing is the key element in these performances". He ended his review saying that the "whole album makes you want to run to a Madonna concert, and that's exactly what a live album is supposed to do."

Simon Button from Attitude commended the release, describing it as "a work of theatrical genius", complimenting the dancers, Madonna's camaraderie onstage and the "smoke-and-mirrors element" in the product. However, he criticized the inclusion of the Tears of a Clown show, finding it to be "as much a car crash as the two hours of the Rebel Heart Tour are a triumph". Writing for DVD Movie Guide, Colin Jacobson felt that "as a concert, Madonna's Rebel Heart Tour falls into the 'good but not great' category. As a video, it disappoints because it fails to effectively recapture the live experience". Roger Wink, from music portal Vintage Vinyl News, was critical of the CD release; "much of the allure of a Madonna show is the visual aspect which doesn't come across on CD, so the DVD/Blu-Ray is probably a much better experience but that doesn't excuse the low points, and there are many of them, in the listening experience".

Commercial reception
In the United Kingdom, Rebel Heart Tour sold 1,993 copies in its first week of release, and debuted at number 42 on the UK Albums Chart. In the United States, Rebel Heart Tour failed to chart on the Billboard 200, but reached numbers 20 and 45 on the Digital Album and Top Album Sales charts for one week each, respectively. The album also reached number two on the Top Music Video chart, being kept from the pole position by Alan Jackson's Precious Memories: Live at the Ryman (2009). Rebel Heart Tour had sold 3,848 copies in the US as of September 24, 2017.

Rebel Heart Tour reached number one in Mexico, and placed at number 69 on the year-end chart. In France, the live album peaked at number 20 on the French Albums Chart selling 1,921 copies, while the video versions topped the French DVD Charts selling 5,044 units in its first-week. The Syndicat National de l'Édition Phonographique (SNEP) certified the video Platinum for selling over 15,000 units. Across the rest of Europe, the album reached the top ten of the charts in Belgium (Flanders and Wallonia), Germany, Hungary, Italy, Portugal and Spain. At the 32nd Japan Gold Disc Award, Rebel Heart Tour won in the category of Best Music Video for Western Artists.

Track listing

Additional notes
"S.E.X." contains elements of "Justify My Love" written by Lenny Kravitz, Ingrid Chavez and Madonna, and performed by Madonna.
DVD / Blu-ray version also includes the a cappella performance of "Diamonds Are a Girl's Best Friend, written by Jule Styne and Leo Robin, performed between "La Vie en rose" and "Unapologetic Bitch".
"Holiday" contains elements of "Take Me to the Mardi Gras" written by Paul Simon and performed by Bob James.

Personnel
Credits adapted from the liner notes of Rebel Heart Tour.

Madonna – creator, vocals, guitar, ukulele
Kiley Dean – backing vocals
Nicki Richards – backing vocals
Nathan Rissman – director
Danny B. Tull – director, lead editor
Jamie King – stage director
Al Gurdon – director of photography
Ric Lipson – stage designer
Arianne Phillips – costume designer
Alexander Hammer – lead editor
Sean Spuehler – vocal mixing engineer
Arthur Fogel – executive producer
Guy Oseary – executive producer
Sara Zambreno – executive producer
Geoff Kempin – executive producer for Eagle Rock Entertainment
Terry Shand – executive producer for Eagle Rock Entertainment
Brian Frasier Moore – drums
Monte Pittman – guitar, ukulele
Ric'key Pageot – keyboards, accordion
Kevin Antunes – music director, keyboards
Kevin Mazur – photography
Jonathan Lia – producer

Charts

Weekly charts

Monthly charts

Year-end charts

Certification and sales

!colspan="3"|Album
|-

!colspan="3"|Video
|-

Release history

See also
 List of number-one albums of 2017 (Mexico)

References

External links

 
 Rebel Heart Tour To Premiere On Showtime Dec 9th at Madonna.com
 Rebel Heart Tour DVD Is Coming Soon! at Madonna.com

2017 live albums
2017 video albums
Eagle Rock Entertainment live albums
Eagle Rock Entertainment video albums
Live video albums
Madonna live albums
Madonna video albums